West Cape is a headland in New Zealand.

West Cape may also refer to:
West Cape, Prince Edward Island, a headland in Canada
West Cape (South Australia), a headland

See also
Western Cape, a province of South Africa